Evasion may refer to:

Evade, a 1960s board game in the 3M bookshelf game series
Évadé, the term given to French and Belgian nationals fleeing German-occupied Europe
Évasion, a Canadian French-language travel and adventure television channel
Évasion FM, a French local radio station
Evasion (ethics), a deceptive act
Evasion (law), to avoid government mandate through specious means (tax evasion, for example)
Evasion (book), a book adapted from a zine of the same title
Evasion (network security), techniques to by-pass network security devices
Evasi0n, an untethered jailbreaking tool for iOS devices
Citroën Evasion, a Eurovan  minivan
Survival, Evasion, Resistance and Escape, American military training program that includes evasion from enemy capture
Evasion, a VR shooter released for the Steam, PS4, HTC Vive, and Oculus Rift and Rift S platforms by Archiact Interactive